Betta nuluhon is a species of gourami. It is native to Asia, where it occurs in western Sabah on the island of Borneo in Malaysia. The species reaches at least 7.06 cm (2.8 inches) in standard length. It was described in 2020 by N. S. S. Kamal (of the Sabah Forestry Department), H. H. Tan (of the National University of Singapore), and Casey K. C. Ng (of Universiti Sains Malaysia). FishBase does not list this species.

References 

nuluhon
Fish described in 2020
Fish of Malaysia